Oxley Mead is a  biological Site of Special Scientific Interest in the Oxley Park district of Shenley Church End in Milton Keynes, (ceremonial) Buckinghamshire.

The site is an ancient hay meadow which has a nationally rare plant community, due to its traditional management, with a hay cut followed by cattle grazing, and no use of fertilisers or herbicides. A stream, which runs through the middle of the field, regularly floods. The main plants are herbs such as great burnet and meadow sweet, and grasses include meadow foxtail and sweet vernal-grass. The meadow is surrounded by hedgerows which have a wide variety of trees and shrubs.

There is access from the end of Raft Way.

References

Sites of Special Scientific Interest in Buckinghamshire